Martina Navratilova was the defending champion and won in the final 7–5, 6–3 against Julie Halard.

Seeds
A champion seed is indicated in bold text while text in italics indicates the round in which that seed was eliminated.

  Martina Navratilova (champion)
 n/a
  Mary Pierce (second round)
  Nathalie Tauziat (first round)
  Katerina Maleeva (semifinals)
  Leila Meskhi (semifinals)
  Sabine Appelmans (quarterfinals)
  Julie Halard (final)

Draw

External links
 ITF tournament edition profile
 Tournament draws

Open GDF Suez
1994 WTA Tour